The Cleveland Indians' 1982 season was the 82nd for the franchise.  The team finished with a 78–84 record (.481), placing them in sixth place (tied with Toronto) in the American League East, 17 games behind the eventual AL champion Milwaukee Brewers.

Offseason 
 January 15, 1982: Rick Waits was signed as a free agent by the Indians.
 February 13, 1982: Mike Stanton was released by the Indians.
 February 16, 1982: Sid Monge was traded by the Indians to the Philadelphia Phillies for Bake McBride.
 March 26, 1982: Dave Rosello was released by the Indians.

Regular season

Season standings

Record vs. opponents

Notable transactions 
 September 12, 1982: John Denny was traded by the Indians to the Philadelphia Phillies for Jerry Reed, Wil Culmer, and Roy Smith.

Opening Day Lineup

Roster

Player stats

Batting
Note: G = Games played; AB = At bats; R = Runs scored; H = Hits; 2B = Doubles; 3B = Triples; HR = Home runs; RBI = Runs batted in; AVG = Batting average; SB = Stolen bases

Pitching
Note: W = Wins; L = Losses; ERA = Earned run average; G = Games pitched; GS = Games started; SV = Saves; IP = Innings pitched; R = Runs allowed; ER = Earned runs allowed; BB = Walks allowed; K = Strikeouts

Awards and honors 
Andre Thornton, Hutch Award
All-Star Game

Farm system

Notes

References 
1982 Cleveland Indians at Baseball Reference
1982 Cleveland Indians at Baseball Almanac

Cleveland Guardians seasons
Cleveland Indians season
Cleve